Some Blues is an album by jazz pianist Jay McShann recorded in 1990 and 1992 and released on the Chiaroscuro label in 1993.

Reception

The Allmusic review by Scott Yanow noted "Four different sessions featuring pianist Jay McShann are on this enjoyable CD ... All of the sessions are quite fun and are filled by colorful solos ... Overall, this is a difficult program not to love".

Track listing
All compositions by Jay McShann except where noted
 "I'm Gonna Sit Right Down and Write Myself a Letter" (Fred E. Ahlert, Joe Young) – 4:46
 "Gee, Baby, Ain't I Good to You" (Andy Razaf, Don Redman) – 3:50
 "Rompin' at Rudy's" – 4:37
 "Sweet Lorraine" (Cliff Burwell, Mitchell Parish) – 5:16
 "Daddling" – 4:36
 "Preaching Blues" – 5:08
 "Ho House Blues" – 6:43
 "Smoke Gets in Your Eyes" (Jerome Kern, Otto Harbach) – 5:11
 "Don't You Love Your Daddy No More" – 5:31
 "Hey Hootie!" – 5:48
 "The Jumpin' Blues" (Charlie Parker, McShann) – 4:12
 "I Want a Little Girl" (Murray Mencher, Billy Moll) – 6:23
 Jazzspeak – 13:26
Recorded on February 2, 1990 at Van Gelder Studio, Englewood Cliffs, NJ (tracks 1-6), on August 8, 1992 at Rainbow Studio, Oslo, Norway (tracks 10-12), on September 16, 1992 (tracks 7-9) at Soundtracks, New York City and unknown date for track 13, which is an interview with the questions edited out

Personnel
Jay McShann - piano, vocals
Clark Terry – trumpet, flugelhorn, vocals (tracks 10-12)
Al Grey – trombone (tracks 7-9)
Major Holley - bass, vocals (tracks 1-6)
Bill Crow (tracks 7-9), Milt Hinton (tracks 10-12) - bass
Bobby Durham (tracks 1-3), Ben Riley (tracks 10-12)  - drums

References

1993 albums
Jay McShann albums
Chiaroscuro Records albums
Albums recorded at Van Gelder Studio